The first season of StarStruck, is a Philippine television reality talent competition show, was broadcast on GMA Network. Hosted by Dingdong Dantes and Nancy Castiglione, it premiered on October 27, 2003. The council was composed of Joey de Leon, Joyce Bernal and Ida Henares. The season ended with 71 episodes on February 1, 2004, having Mark Herras and Jennylyn Mercado as the Ultimate Survivors.

The series is streaming online on YouTube.

Overview
StarStruck was first announced on GMA Network program SOP, where the hosts invited teenagers from 14 to 18 years old to audition for the upcoming season. Most of the auditions were held at the GMA Network's headquarters and at SM Supermalls throughout the Philippines.

The first season was directed by Lino Cayetano, who studied and taught film in the University of the Philippines, aside from his film and audio-visual communications course in New York Film Academy.

The pilot episode was aired on October 27, 2003. StarStruck was shown only on weekdays with tests shown from Mondays to Thursdays and the elimination night aired on Fridays. The show held its Final Judgment on February 1, 2004, at the Araneta Coliseum.

Selection process
In the first year of the reality-talent search, Out of hundreds who auditioned nationwide, only the Top 100 was chosen for the first cut. From the Top 100, it was trimmed down to the Top 60, then from the Top 60 to the Top 30, and from the Top 30 to the final fourteen finalists. 
	
The Final 14 underwent various workshops and training in order to develop their personalities, talents, and charisma. But, the twist is that every week, one or two hopefuls from the final fourteen may have to say goodbye until only four remain. Those who were eliminated were dubbed as StarStruck Avengers.

The Final 4 will vie for the coveted the Ultimate Survivors titles, the Ultimate Male Survivor and the Ultimate Female Survivor, both of them will received P1,000,000 pesos each plus and an exclusive management contract from GMA Network.

The Runners-up, both of them will received P100,000 pesos each plus and an exclusive management contract from the network.  The StarStruck Avengers (the losing contestants) also received an exclusive contract from the network.

Hopefuls
When the Final 14 was chosen, they are assigned to different challenges every week that will hone their acting, singing, and dancing abilities. Every Friday, one is meant to leave the competition until there were just six others who are left. From survivor six, there will be two of them who will be eliminated and after the elimination of the two; the final four will be revealed.

The Final 4 will be battling with each other on the Final Judgment. People will choose who they want to win the competition by online voting and text voting. 30% of the result will come from the online and text votes and the remaining 70% is from the council.

Color key:

Weekly Artista Tests
Color key:

Week 1: The official Final 14 hopefuls have been chosen.

Week 2: The Final 13 hopefuls.

Week 3: The Final 12 hopefuls.

Week 4: The Final 11 hopefuls.

Week 5: The Final 10 hopefuls.

Week 6: The Final 9 hopefuls.

Week 7: The Final 8 hopefuls.

Week 8: The Final 7 hopefuls. Avengers versus Survivors.

Week 9: The Final 6 hopefuls.

Eliminated Contestant: None

Week 10: The Survivor 6 hopefuls, The official Final 4 hopefuls have been chosen.

Challenge Winner Contestant: Not Awarded

Week 11-12: The Final 4 Homecoming

Week 13: The Final Judgment, the Ultimate Survivors have been proclaimed.

Final Judgment
The winner was announced on a two-hour TV special dubbed as StarStruck: The Final Judgment was held live on February 1, 2004, at the Araneta Coliseum, the venue of the event was jampacked with an estimated 15,000 StarStruck fans and supporters and almost the same number of fans used to wait outside the venue because of seats' insufficiency.

The opening dance number, together with this season's avengers, and they were joined by this final four. Hosted by Dingdong Dantes and Nancy Castiglione. The council was formed with Joey de Leon, Joyce Bernal and Ida Henares.

The final four then performs their solo performances. Rainier Castillo a dance number by a song of Klippers’s Step Into The Rhythm performs a solo dance number with the Abstract dancers, and Mark Herras a dance number by a song of Britney Spears’s Outrageous performs a solo dance number with the Manoeuvres, Yasmien Kurdi sang Christina Aguilera’s The Voice Within, Jennylyn Mercado sang Alicia Keys’s Fallin.

The avengers’ performance came in next, in a song and dance medley detailing the journey of the survivors from the audition process, the four International contenders and the elimination of the tenth avengers for a sing and dance number.

The male survivors, Rainier Castillo and Mark Herras dancing together with Joshua Zamora dance number with the Manoeuvres. Next the female survivors, Yasmien Kurdi and Jennylyn Mercado singing together with Lani Misalucha sang Mananatili Kang Mahal, Jaya sang Wala Na Bang Pag-ibig, and Regine Velasquez sang Dadalhin.

Announcement come, Jennylyn Mercado of Las Piñas is the Ultimate Female Survivor and Mark Herras of San Pablo, Laguna is the Ultimate Male Survivor were proclaimed as the Ultimate Survivors, each of them received P1,000,000 pesos each plus and an exclusive management contract from GMA Network.

While, Yasmien Kurdi of San Juan and Rainier Castillo of Quezon City were proclaimed as the Runners-up, each of them received P100,000 pesos each plus and an exclusive management contract from the network. The StarStruck Avengers (the losing contestants) also received an exclusive contract from the network.

It was also announced that the final fourteen will be having our own show. The Final Judgment rated 42.8%, impressively high for a late Sunday night telecast; the StarStruck: The Final Judgment was the only TV event that narrowly matched the Eat Bulaga Silver Anniversary Special.

Signature dances
There are signature dances and journey songs made in this batch are the following:
 Average Joe
 Hey Yah 
 Milkshake
 Outrageous
 Rubber Necking
 Step Into The Rhythm

Stage 1: The StarStruck Playhouse
Because of the StarStruck fever, GMA Network created a new show, Stage 1: The StarStruck Playhouse. it premiered on March 22, 2004. The StarStruck test continues on this show where the final fourteen has to prove their staying power in the business. Every week from Mondays to Thursdays, the show presents a miniseries starring the final fourteen, but this time their acting prowess is put into test. The series ended on August 12, 2004 to give way to Joyride.

Color key:

Stage 1: LIVE!
Fridays would serve as critical day because the audience will judge their performance for the week through text messaging. An acting award is also given to the survivor who excelled in that week. Stage 1: LIVE! Is also somewhat a variety show for the survivors?

If Mondays to Thursdays, they showed their acting skills, during Fridays, they are able to show their dancing, singing and hosting prowess. The show was hosted by Chynna Ortaleza, Cogie Domingo and Raymond Gutierrez. The show already went off the air.

Elimination chart
Color key:

Notes

 It was a non-elimination week. The bottom group are Mark Herras, Nadine Samonte and Dion Ignacio, But next week the two survivors were eliminated from the competition on January 9, 2004.
 The final four was chosen on January 9, 2004. And the last avengers are Dion Ignacio and Nadine Samonte, The first called to eliminate is Dion Ignacio and the second called is Nadine Samonte.
 In the final judgment night, Mark Herras and Jennylyn Mercado were proclaimed as the Ultimate Survivors.

References

External links
 

StarStruck (Philippine TV series)
2003 Philippine television seasons
2004 Philippine television seasons